Rubber Lover may refer to:

"Rubber Lover" (Deee-Lite song)
"Rubber Lover" (Marmaduke Duke song)

See also
Rubber's Lover, 1996 film
Latex and PVC fetishism